The South American Under-17 Women's Football Championship (Spanish: Campeonato Sudamericano Sub-17 Femenino) is an international women's association football competition held every two years for South American under-17 women teams and serves as a qualification tournament for the FIFA U-17 Women's World Cup.

Results

Notes

Performances by countries

Participating nations
Legend
 – Champions
 – Runners-up
 – Third place
 – Fourth place
GS – Group stage
 — Hosts

FIFA World Cup qualification and results
All editions have qualified three teams to the FIFA U-17 Women's World Cup. Venezuela has been the only team to win in the quarter-finals of this tournament, placing 4th in 2014 and 2016. Brazil has reached the quarter-final twice. All other CONMEBOL teams have been eliminated in the group stages.

QF = World Cup quarter-final
GS = World Cup group stage
Q = Qualified to world cup
4th = 4th Place

See also
 South American Under-20 Women's Football Championship

References

External links
 
 Championship results at the RSSSF

 
Under-17 association football
CONMEBOL competitions for women's national teams
South American youth sports competitions